The Saint Paul Seminary is a Roman Catholic major seminary in St. Paul, Minnesota.  A part of the Archdiocese of Saint Paul and Minneapolis, the seminary prepares men to enter the priesthood and permanent diaconate, and educates lay men and women on Catholic theology. It is associated with Saint John Vianney College Seminary.

SPS sits on the south campus of the University of St. Thomas. Since its creation in 1894, over 3,000 seminarians from SPS have been ordained priests.  Thirty-three of these priests were consecrated as bishops, including three archbishops. One Saint Paul Seminary alumnus,  Archbishop Fulton J. Sheen, is a candidate for canonization.

As of the 2021-2022 academic year, SPS had:

 90 seminarians in formation for the priesthood, representing 16 dioceses and religious communities
 26 men in formation for the permanent diaconate 
 87 lay students enrolled in the School of Divinity's graduate degree programs. 
 500 students enrolled in the Archbishop Harry J. Flynn Catechetical Institute, a two-year, non-degree faith formation program.

History

Establishment 
After the opening of St. John's College in 1867, most minor seminarians for the Diocese of Saint Paul were educated there or at other seminary institutions in the United States or in Europe. However, Thomas Grace hoped that eventually a dedicated college for the Diocese would be founded, and in November 1866 purchased forty acres on the shores of Lake Johanna with the hope it would eventually become a seminary.

Grace's successor, John Ireland, took office in June 1884, and in December of that same year announced plans to build a seminary for the Diocese, which would become the College of St. Thomas. The fledgling college was not unique among Catholic institutions of its time in that it functioned as a sort of combination theological seminary, minor seminary, junior college, high school, and junior high school. The land at Lake Johanna would eventually become Nazareth Hall Preparatory Seminary. The College of Saint Thomas was established in 1885.

There was a desire for a dedicated theologate seminary, and plans for a major seminary to be established on the land kitty-corner to the College were formed. Ireland's primary benefactor for this project was James J. Hill, president of the Great Northern Railway. Hill was a Protestant, but his wife Mary Hill was a devout Catholic. In honor of his wife, James Hill donated $500,000 to create SPS.

The campus of the Saint Paul Seminary was designed by architect Cass Gilbert, who also designed the Minnesota State Capitol.  The six original buildings were constructed to look like a train depot (the SPS administration building), a steam engine (gymnasium and physical plant), box cars (Cretin, Grace (though constructed in 1913), and Loras halls), a refectory, and a roundhouse (school building).  The campus was completed in 1894. The dormitory row (Loras, Cretin, and Grace halls) at SPS was nominated to the National Register of Historic Places in 1986 as a historic district, but the listing was never finalized.

The dedication ceremony for the Saint Paul Seminary was attended by the apostolic delegate to the United States, Archbishop Francesco Satolli, four other archbishops, ten bishops, and over four hundred priests.  The Pontifical Mass was attended by 20,000 people all told. The Mass was celebrated outdoors, with an altar constructed up against the administration building.

When it opened in 1894, SPS had sixty-five seminarians.

John Ireland's deep involvement with the Catholic University of America led to an affiliation that allowed any graduate of SPS to present himself for a baccelaureate degree from CUA.

Ireland then began the second phase of the SPS project; erecting St. Mary's Chapel. Its decoration was quite plain to begin with until Archbishop Austin Dowling undertook a remodeling of the interior in the 1920s. It was dedicated on May 4, 1905 by Bishop Cotter of Winona; Bishop McGolrick of Duluth celebrated the Pontifical Mass, and Bishop O'Gorman of Sioux Falls preached.

The unexpected deaths of Bishop Cotter and Bishop Shanley of Fargo and the resignation of Bishop Stariha of Lead, all in 1909, prompted a crisis of the episcopate in the Upper Midwest. In addition, the Diocese of Crookston and Diocese of Bismarck were established. As such, there were five sees that required bishops. With the additional assignment of an axuliary bishop for Saint Paul, six priests required episcopal consecration. That consecration took place at St. Mary's Chapel on May 19, 1910. Approximately 1,000 people filled the chapel that day for the ceremony.

Affiliation with Saint Thomas 

While the Saint Paul Seminary and University of St. Thomas both were owned by the Archdiocese and were next to each, they operated separately. In 1980, rector Monsignor William Baumgaertner began to think that collaboration between the two institutions could have some great benefit. Bishop Kinney of Saint Cloud suggested a merger in 1981. From 1983 t9 1987, there was much discussion and politics attempting to determine what such a union should look like. Finally, in 1987, an agreement was made. Under the agreement, Saint Paul Seminary built new administration and dormitory buildings and sold the most of its land and buildings to St. Thomas, including Loras, Grace, and Cretin residence halls and the Binz refectory. The Ireland library building was included in the sale, but the books remained the property of Saint Paul Seminary.

The reorganization allowed SPS increased resources for formation of seminarians to priests.  The new School of Divinity provided graduate level course in theology for lay people who wished to assume leadership roles in their parishes and schools. The School of Divinity would remain under the jurisdiction of SPS.

Contemporary History 

In 2005, Monsignor Aloysius R. Callaghan was appointed rector of SPS. During his tenure as rector, Saint Paul Seminary greatly increased its enrollment and programs.

During the transition to John Clayton Nienstedt as Archbishop of Saint Paul and Minneapolis in 2008, the archbishop was removed as ex-officio chair of the Board of Directors of the university, allowing the seminary the option to pull out of the affiliation agreement at any time.

On January 1, 2019, Reverend Joseph Taphorn succeeded Callaghan as Saint Paul Seminary rector. Under Taphorn, resturcturing to allow for the implementation of a propadeutic year began.

Campus

Academic buildings 
The Archbishop Ireland Memorial Library is the theological library of SPS with over 110,000 volumes. The library is integrated into the University of St. Thomas library system so that non-seminary students are able to use its resources as well. Classes are held in the Brady Educational Center, which also houses the undergraduate music department of the University of St. Thomas.

Residence and administration buildings 
Loras, Grace, and Cretin halls were the original SPS residence buildings; they were sold to the University of St. Thomas during the seminary/university affiliation agreement. Ground was broken on the current residence and administration buildings in 1988, and they were completed in 1989.

Seminarians in the propadeutic program live in a former convent several blocks off-campus.

St. Mary's Chapel 

The center of Ireland's vision for SPS, was the chapel dedicated to the Blessed Virgin Mary.  The cornerstone of the chapel was laid during a Pontifical Mass on July 2, 1901, the fiftieth anniversary of Bishop Joseph Crétin's arrival in the new diocese.  Though envisioned in 1891, the chapel was only completed by architect Clarence H. Johnston, Sr., who completed the last of Hill's ambitious building project, in an Italian Romanesque style.  St. Mary's chapel was officially consecrated by Bishop Cotter on May 24, 1905, in another Pontifical High Mass celebrated by Bishop McGolrick.  Under Archbishop Austin Dowling, the interior of the chapel was finished in the 1920s.

Bishop Fulton Sheen, in his autobiography A Treasure in Clay, talks about how his love for a daily Holy Hour was started at St. Mary's Chapel.

The chapel was renovated in 1988, as part of the construction of the new SPS building, with a new design by Frank Kacmarcik which included reversing the interior of the chapel, removing the statues from the side altars, and whitewashing the interior decoration. Archbishop Roach intervened before the stained glass windows and the mural in the apse (now the entrance) could be destroyed, though too late to preserve the original high altar.  The dramatic simplification of the chapel was done in order to capture the original look of the chapel's starkness before Archbishop Dowling had the interior finished.

Presently, the interior of the chapel has begun to be redecorated when the original Stations of the Cross were restored to the chapel, a statue of Our Lady of Confidence (Madonna della Fiducia) was installed and dedicated in a side-altar niche, and a relic of Saint Mother Teresa of Calcutta was placed for veneration in the chapel.  All of the new additions were done under the direction of rector Aloysius Callaghan.

Priestly formation program 
Throughout all the years of formation, men who are sponsored by Catholic dioceses to study for the Catholic priesthood at SPS have a spiritual director, academic adviser, and formation director.

Propaedeutic Stage 

A component of the 2016 Ratio Fundamentalis Institutionis Sacerdotalis and the new sixth edition of the United States Conference of Catholic Bishops Program for Priestly Formation is the addition of a "propaedeutic" stage. This year of "pre-seminary" formation focused on human and spiritual growth prepares men for the discipleship and configuration stages represented by Pre-theology and Theology studies.

Pre-theology 

The pre-theology program is a two-year, non-degree seeking program for men in priestly formation who already have an undergraduate degree not from a college seminary. The program contains various philosophy and theology classes, some of which are taken at the University of St. Thomas and some of which are entirely in-house.

Theology 
The M.Div. program is a four-year program which includes summer pastoral programs such as hospital ministry, Spanish immersion, and parish placements. The academic curriculum was revised and updated in 2016.

Each seminarian has a "Teaching Parish" in the area where he is assigned throughout his four years of theology. At his "Teaching Parish," the seminarian is expected to grow in skills needed for pastoral ministry under the mentorship of an experienced pastor and committee of laypeople.

During the January Term ("J-Term"), men in their second, third, and fourth years go on trips to Mexico, the Holy Land, and Rome, respectively.

Lay graduate programs 
The Master of Arts in Theology degree is a two-year, 36 credit program focused on academic theology. While students of the MAT program are primarily laypeople, it can also be taken by seminarians alongside their M.Div. degree.

SPS also has a Master of Arts in Pastoral Leadership (MAPL) program, which is also 36 credits.

Catechetical Institute 
In 2008, the Archbishop Harry J. Flynn Catechetical Institute was established. The AHJFCI is a two-year program which allows lay students to study the Catechism of the Catholic Church in depth. The program it split into four modules/semesters and meets once a week. The program primarily meets at SPS, but there are satellite locations at local parishes as well as in the Roman Catholic Diocese of Des Moines. There are more than 600 lay students enrolled in the Catechetical Institute.

Institute for Diaconate Formation 
Formation for permanent deacons for the Archdiocese of Saint Paul and Minneapolis also occurs at SPS. It is a five-year program, including the pre-requisite of graduating from the two year Catechetical Institute.

Student life 
Seminarians participate in a wide variety of activities, including choir, schola, theatre, and sports.

Theatre 
In the past, SPS had a theatre program going back as far as 1939. The program appears to have died out in the late 1960s. In 2013, seminarians revived the theatre program and have put on various plays and musicals, many of them originals, since then. While most of the productions have only been put on by seminarians from SPS, Saint John Vianney College Seminary has been invited to join some of them as well.

Sports 
Each year in October, Saint John Vianney College Seminary (playing as the "JAXX") and SPS (playing as the "Sons of Thunder") play each other in a flag football game called the "Rectors' Bowl." SPS has won twelve of the nineteen Rectors' Bowls.

In the spring, there is a priest/seminarian basketball tournament where Saint John Vianney College Seminary and the SPS face-off, and the winner of that match plays a team consisting of priests from the Archdiocese of Saint Paul and Minneapolis.

Seminarians regularly play frisbee, basketball, and other sports together. They also regularly participate in other seminary tournaments such as the Conception Seminary soccer & volleyball tournament.

Notable faculty 
Some notable past and present faculty members of SPS include:

 Msgr. Aloysius R. Callaghan
 Bishop Peter F. Christensen
 Bishop Andrew Cozzens
 Sister Katarina Schuth, OSF

Notable alumni 

 Bishop Joseph John Annabring
 Bishop Juan Carlos Bravo Salazar
 Bishop William Henry Bullock
 Archbishop James Byrne
 Bishop Frederick F. Campbell
 Archbishop Robert J. Carlson
 Bishop Peter F. Christensen
 Bishop Leonard Cowley
 Bishop Andrew Cozzens 
 Father Dennis Dease
 Bishop Donald DeGrood
 Bishop Paul Dudley
 Bishop James Albert Duffy
 Bishop Lawrence Glenn
 Bishop Thomas O'Gorman
 Bishop Hilary Baumann Hacker
 Father Patrick J. Hessian, 16th Chief of Chaplains of the United States Army from 1982 to 1986.
 Bishop Lambert Anthony Hoch
 Bishop-elect Michael Izen
 Bishop John Francis Kinney
 Bishop Louis Benedict Kucera
 Bishop Raymond W. Lessard
 Bishop Raymond Alphonse Lucker
 Bishop Lawrence James McNamara
 Bishop John Jeremiah McRaith
 Father Francis Missia
 Bishop Gerald Francis O'Keefe
 Rt. Rev. Msgr James O'Neill, Brigadier General, U.S. Army
 Bishop Richard Pates
 Archbishop John Roach
 Msgr. John A. Ryan
 Msgr. Patrick J. Ryan, American major general who served as the ninth Chief of Chaplains of the United States Army from 1954 to 1958.
 Msgr. Francis L. Sampson, 12th Chief of Chaplains of the United States Army from 1967 to 1971; he saved the real "Private Ryan" who the movie Saving Private Ryan was based on.
 Bishop Francis Schenk
 Bishop Alphonse James Schladweiler
 Father Michael Schmitz
 Msgr. William Shannahan
 Msgr. Donald W. Shea, 19th Chief of Chaplains of the United States Army from 1994 to 1999.
 Archbishop Fulton Sheen
 Bishop Paul Sirba
 Bishop George Henry Speltz
 Bishop Sylvester William Treinen
 Father Henry Timothy ("Tim") Vakoc, the first U.S. military chaplain to die from wounds received in the Iraq War.
 Bishop Nicolas Walsh
 Bishop Thomas Anthony Welch
 Bishop Stephen S. Woznicki

History of Rectors 
 Father Louis Eugene Caillet (1894–1897)
 Father Patrick R. Heffron, DD, JUD (1897–1910)
 Father Francis J. Schaefer, DD, JUD (1910–1921)
 Father Humphrey Moynihan, STD (1921–1933)
 Father William O. Brady, STD (1933–1939)
 Father Lawrence O. Wolf, PhD (1939–1943)
 Father James Louis Connolly, Dr. Sc. Hist. (1943–1945)
 Father Rudolph G. Bandas, Ph.D.Agg., STD  (1945–1958)
 Bishop William O. Brady, STD (1958)
 Father Louis J. McCarthy, PhD (1958–1968)
 Monsignor William Baumgaertner, PhD (1968–1980)
 Father Charles Froehle, STD (1980–1993)
 Father Phillip J. Rask, PhD (1993–2002)
 Bishop Frederick Campbell, PhD (2002–2005)
 Monsignor Aloysius R. Callaghan, STL, JCD (2006–2018)
 Father Joseph Taphorn, JCL (2010–present)

Sponsoring dioceses and religious orders* 

 Archdiocese of St. Paul and Minneapolis
 Diocese of Boise
 Diocese of Crookston
 Diocese of Des Moines
 Diocese of Duluth
 Diocese of Fargo
 Archdiocese of Hartford
 Diocese of Helena
 Diocese of New Ulm
 Archdiocese of Omaha
 Pro Ecclesia Sancta (Peru)
 Diocese of Rapid City
 Diocese of St. Cloud
 Diocese of Sioux Falls
 Diocese of Winona-Rochester

*Updated as of 2022.

References

External links
The Saint Paul Seminary School of Divinity official website
Official video of The Saint Paul Seminary School of Divinity
Archdiocese of St. Paul and Minneapolis website
 St. John Vianney Seminary

Educational institutions established in 1894
Roman Catholic Ecclesiastical Province of Saint Paul and Minneapolis
Catholic seminaries in the United States
Seminaries and theological colleges in Minnesota
University of St. Thomas (Minnesota)
Catholic seminaries
1894 establishments in Minnesota